Victoria Alexandrovna Moiseeva (born January 10, 1991) is a Russian curler. She won gold as an alternate of the Russian national women's team at the 2013 Winter Universiade and the 2015 Winter Universiade. She plays for CC Adamant (St. Petersburg).

She skipped the Russian national women's curling team at the 2016 European Curling Championships, and also skipped the Olympic Athletes from Russia team at the 2018 Winter Olympics.

Awards
 2018 Ford World Women's Curling Championship: Bronze (2018).
 European Curling Championships: Gold (2016).
 Curling at the Winter Universiade: Gold (2013, 2015).
 World Junior Curling Championships: Bronze (2011, 2012).

Personal life
Moiseeva was born in Miass, Chelyabinsk Oblast, Russia. In her childhood she performed choreography of traditional and variety dances, but choose curling instead. She went to the Specialized Children's and Youth Sports School of Olympic Reserve "School of Highest Sports Mastership in Winter Disciplines" in St. Petersburg.

She finished the St. Petersburg State University of Telecommunications.

Moiseeva graduated from Lesgaft National State University of Physical Education, Sport and Health.

She announced an engagement with Danish curler Oliver Dupont in June 2017. They are planning to marry in June next year.

Grand Slam record

Teams

References

External links

1991 births
Living people
People from Miass
Russian female curlers
Russian curling champions
European curling champions
Universiade medalists in curling
Curlers at the 2018 Winter Olympics
Olympic curlers of Russia
Universiade gold medalists for Russia
Universiade silver medalists for Russia
Competitors at the 2013 Winter Universiade
Competitors at the 2015 Winter Universiade
Competitors at the 2017 Winter Universiade
Lesgaft National State University of Physical Education, Sport and Health alumni
Sportspeople from Chelyabinsk Oblast